Soorya Manasam is a 1992 Indian Malayalam-language drama film directed by Viji Thampi and written by Sab John. The film stars Mammootty, along with Sowcar Janaki, Vaishnavi, Vinodini, Raghuvaran, Riza Bava and Jagathy Sreekumar playing supporting roles. The film revolves around Putturumees, a mentally challenged man and his mother who face several social issues in their village.

Plot 

Putturumees is a mentally challenged man who lives in a small village with his mother. The villagers face several issues due to his condition and compel his mother to take him to a new place.

Cast 
 Mammootty as Putturumees
 Sowcar Janaki as Mariya
 Vaishnavi as young Mariya
 Vinodini as Mooppan's daughter
 Anugraha as Subhadra
 Raghuvaran as Shivan
 Riza Bava as Stephan, Tea Estate Owner
 Ashokan
 Siddique as Urumees's father
 Jagathy Sreekumar as Mooppan
 Jagannathan as Madhavan, Tea shop owner
 Jagannatha Varma as Fr. Joseph Varkey
 T. P. Madhavan as Fr. Jacob Kurian
 Augustine as Govindan, Shivan's henchman
 James as Muthu
 Shivaji as Inspector Unnikrishnan
 Viji Thampi as landlord
 Biyon

Music 
The music for the film was composed by M. M. Keeravani and the lyrics were written by Kaithapram Damodaran Namboothiri. The background music was composed by S. P. Venkatesh.

Song list
 "Tharalitha Ravil Mayangiyo Sooryamanasam": K. J. Yesudas
 "Kannil Nila": Mano
 "Meghatherirangum Sanchari": K. S. Chithra
 "Tharalitha Ravil Mayangiyo Sooryamanasam": K. S. Chithra

Reception 
Malini Mannath of The Indian Express wrote, "There is no wrong step in the characterisation of the simpleton. Tight screenplay and slick editing enhance the narrative value."

Awards 
 1993 Kerala Film Critics Award for Best Actor – Mammootty

References

External links 
 

1990s Malayalam-language films
1992 drama films
1992 films
Films about mental health
Films about disability in India
Films shot in Munnar
Films shot in Ooty
Films directed by Viji Thampi
Films scored by M. M. Keeravani
Indian drama films
Of Mice and Men